In the United Kingdom, political slogans and memorable phrases are used during election campaigns to put across messages and rally support. Slogans used by political parties often centre around current issues of the day or policies they wish to address.

1975 EEC membership referendum 
In deciding whether to remain or leave the single market, parties rallied behind "Yes" and "No" messages.

1979 general election

1983 general election

1987 general election

1992 general election

1997 general election

2001 general election

2005 general election

2010 general election

2015 general election

2016 EU membership referendum 
In 2016 the United Kingdom's referendum on membership of the European Union saw political parties align into two camps; Leave and Remain. Messages on the Leave side focused on themes such as regaining sovereignty and the benefits of leaving the EU, while the Remain sides argued benefits of staying and the dangers of leaving.

2017 general election

2019 general election

Welsh Parliament

2021 Welsh Parliament election

References 

Lists of slogans